See Also: List of kings of the Lombards

The Queen consorts of the Lombards were the wives of the Lombardic kings who ruled that Germanic people from early in the sixth century until the Lombardic identity became lost in the ninth and tenth centuries. After 568, the Lombard kings sometimes styled themselves Kings of Italy (rex totius Italiae), making their wives Queen consorts of Italy. After 774, they were not Lombards, but Franks. There was never a female Lombardic monarch due to the Salic law. After Queen Rosamund all the Lombard queens were also Queens of Italy.

Queen consorts of the Lombards

See also
List of Italian consorts
List of Austrian consorts
List of Hungarian consorts
List of Bohemian consorts

Lombards Queens